Cupressus dupreziana, the Saharan cypress, or tarout, is a very rare coniferous tree native to the Tassili n'Ajjer mountains in the central Sahara desert, southeast Algeria, where it forms a unique population of trees hundreds of kilometres from any other trees. There are only 233 specimens of this endangered species, the largest about 22 m tall. The majority are estimated to be over 2000 years old, with very little regeneration due to the increasing desertification of the Sahara. Rainfall totals in the area are estimated to be about 30 mm annually.  The largest one is named Tin-Balalan is believed to be the oldest tarout tree with a circumference of 12 meters or 36 feet.

This species is distinct from the allied Cupressus sempervirens (Mediterranean cypress) in its much bluer foliage with a white resin spot on each leaf, the smaller shoots often being flattened in a single plane. It also has smaller cones, only 1.5–2.5 cm long. Cupressus atlantica (Moroccan cypress) is more similar, and is treated as a variety of the Saharan cypress (C. dupreziana var. atlantica) by some authors.

Probably as a result of its isolation and low population, the Saharan cypress has evolved a unique reproductive system of male apomixis whereby the seeds develop entirely from the genetic content of the pollen. There is no genetic input from the female "parent", which only provides nutritional sustenance. The Moroccan cypress does not share this characteristic.

The Saharan cypress is occasionally cultivated in southern and western Europe, in part for ex situ genetic conservation, but also as an ornamental tree.

An international arboretum is being established in Canberra, Australian Capital Territory (ACT), Australia within which will be established forests of rare and endangered species from throughout the world. One of these forests is dedicated to Cupressus dupreziana and 1300 of the trees have been propagated for planting in late 2007.

Notes

References 
 Stewart, P.J. 1969. Cupressus dupreziana, threatened conifer of the Sahara. Biological Conservation 2: 10–12.
 Pichot, C., Fady, B., & Hochu, I. 2000. Lack of mother tree alleles in zymograms of Cupressus dupreziana A. Camus embryos. Ann. For. Sci. 57: 17–22. Full article (pdf file)
 Pichot, C., El Maátaoui, M., Raddi, S. & Raddi, P. 2001. Surrogate mother for endangered Cupressus. Nature 412: 39.

External links 

 Gymnosperm Database: Cupressus dupreziana
 Arboretum de Villardebelle - photos of trees in the Sahara
 saudiaramcoworld.com - A Cypress in the Sahara
 Conifers Around the World: Cupressus dupreziana - Tarout
 Cartoonist Michael Leunig's life as a guerrilla gardener on the curly and narrow "Talking Plants", Radio National, Australian Broadcasting Corporation

dupreziana
Endemic flora of Algeria
Flora of North Africa
Trees of Algeria
Trees of Africa
Trees of Mediterranean climate
Endangered flora of Africa
Plants described in 1926
Garden plants of Africa
Ornamental trees
Taxa named by Aimée Antoinette Camus